Alex McIntosh may refer to:

 Alex McIntosh (footballer) (1916–1965), Scottish footballer
 Alex McIntosh (footballer, born 1923)  (1923-1998),  Scottish footballer, full back for Inverurie Loco, Dundee, Barrow and Carlisle United
 Alex McIntosh (bowls) (1936–2008), Scottish lawn bowler
 Alex McIntosh (politician) (born 1934), Canadian politician

See also
 Alex Macintosh (1925–1997), BBC presenter and continuity announcer